Hugh Hare, 1st Baron Coleraine (1606 – 19 October 1667), was an English courtier.

Life
Hare had inherited a large amount of money from his great-uncle Sir Nicholas Hare, Master of the Rolls. On the death of his father, his mother had remarried Henry Montagu, 1st Earl of Manchester, allowing the young Hare to rise rapidly in Court and social circles. He married Montagu's daughter by his first marriage and purchased the manor of Tottenham, including the Lordship House, in 1625, and was raised to the Irish peerage as Baron Coleraine shortly thereafter.

As he was closely associated with the court of Charles I, Coleraine's fortunes went into decline during the English Civil War. His castle at Longford and his house in Totteridge were seized by Parliamentary forces, and returned upon the Restoration in a severe state of disrepair. Records of Tottenham from the period are now lost, and the ownership and condition of the Lordship House during the Commonwealth of England are unknown. 
Lord Coleraine died at his home in Totteridge in 1667, having choked to death on a bone eating turkey whilst laughing and drinking.

Family
He married, in 1632, Lucy, second daughter of his stepfather, Henry Montagu, 1st Earl of Manchester, and his first wife, Catherine, second daughter of Sir William Spencer of Yarnton, Oxfordshire, and had, with other issue, Henry, and Hugh (1637–1683), who inherited the estate at Docking in Norfolk. 
Lady Coleraine survived until February 1681/82, and was buried on the 9th at Totteridge.

References

Bibliography

1606 births
1667 deaths
Barons in the Peerage of Ireland
Peers of Ireland created by Charles I
Barons Coleraine